Gabriel Leite Borges (born 6 March 1995) is a Brazilian professional footballer who plays for Mirassol as a midfielder.

Club career
Born in Campo Grande, Leite joined the youth academy of Paulista at the age of 12. He made his senior debut with the side in 2013, representing the team at Copa São Paulo de Futebol Júnior and Copa Paulista. After featuring five times for the club in Paulista A1 in the following year, he joined Palmeiras on 20 May 2014 for a fee of $ 1.5 million.

After representing the side in 2015 Copa São Paulo de Futebol Júnior, he was promoted to the senior team ahead of the season. In April, Leite was called up to the senior team for a Copa do Brasil match against Sampaio Corrêa. On 1 September, he was loaned out to Paraná for the rest of the season. Eight days later, he made his first team debut, starting in a 2–1 defeat against Botafogo.

On 28 April 2016, Leite was loaned out to Criciúma. After returning from loan, he was deemed surplus to the requirements of Verdão and was subsequently loaned out to Osasco Audax on 14 December.

On 21 May 2017, Leite's contract was extended until December 2019. On 8 June, he was loaned out to Guarani for the remainder of the season. However, he was still suffering from an injury which meant that he could immeadeiately make his debut. By the end of the following month, he completely recovered from his injury.

On 24 May 2018, Leite was loaned out to Red Bull Brasil until mid-2019.

References

External links

1995 births
Living people
Association football midfielders
Campeonato Brasileiro Série B players
Paulista Futebol Clube players
Sociedade Esportiva Palmeiras players
Paraná Clube players
Criciúma Esporte Clube players
Grêmio Osasco Audax Esporte Clube players
Guarani FC players
Red Bull Brasil players
Mirassol Futebol Clube players
Brazilian footballers
People from Campo Grande
Sportspeople from Mato Grosso do Sul